Philippa Jones (born 1982, Buckinghamshire, United Kingdom) is a British artist and curator based in St. John's, Newfoundland and Labrador. Her practice includes printmaking, painting, animation, and interactive installations, to explore constructed realities and active myth making. She is notable as the first artist from Newfoundland and Labrador to be included in the National Gallery of Canada contemporary biennial.

Career
Prior to moving to Canada in 2009, Philippa Jones completed a Bachelors of Fine Art and a Masters of Art in Interactive Art & Design at University College Falmouth. In 2012, Jones was included in the exhibition "New Romantics" at The Rooms, alongside Photographer Anthony Redpath and artist Kelly Richardson, curated by Bruce Johnson.

When describing Jones' work in 'New Romantics,' author Katie Bethune Leamen wrote: "Jones creates feelings of physical displacement and wizard-like communion with animals." Her work was then featured in a solo exhibition entitled "MIRIAD," the result of a three-month residency at The Rooms as part of the Elbow Room Residency Program. The exhibition was curated by Mireille Eagan.

MIRIAD (Ministry of Intuitive Research in Imagined and Actual Discoveries) is a fictional scientific organization whose directive is to "contribute to known truths through imaginative exploration."  Through playful scenarios where individuals adopt roles, participants "formulate hypotheses free from preconceptions, initiating research by imagining truths, then seeking to substantiate these imaginings through the discovery of actual artifacts and specimens."thumb|506x506px|Specimen circles (2012)Acting as a lead researcher, Jones constructed a representation of an island as other individuals acting as experts imagined it collectively, translating the results of their research into sculpture, installation, and drawings including the 15-foot pen and ink drawing "MIRIAD Island."

The drawing, and the process of creating it, was described as "an unfolding linear landscape consisting of myriad geometric shapes and expressive washes in subtly monochromatic tones. ... The drawing was allowed to unfold intuitively, starting with a clearly imagined horizontal structure inspired by the vastness of the Newfoundland landscape. The artist deliberately had no end vision for the final island, wanting instead to see how it would grow and attempting to keep herself (in her own words) 'in a state of continuous imaginative possibilities.'"

In 2014, the National Gallery of Canada collected Jones' work "MIRIAD Island." This piece was exhibited in ‘Shine a Light: Canadian Biennial 2014’ at The National Gallery of Canada and was curated by Josée Drouin-Brisebois, Greg Hill, Andrea Kunard, Jonathan Shaughnessy and Rhiannon Vogl. As the curatorial text for the National Gallery of Canada described: "The resulting drawing shows both her automatic way of working and the physical results of this creative and research-based practice."

In 2016, Jones' piece "Silence" was shown at "Writing Topography," the Marion McCain Exhibition of Contemporary Atlantic Art' curated by Corinna Ghaznavi at the Beaverbrook Art Gallery. Later that same year, Jones' project, 'A Study into the Phenomena of the Newfoundland Bubble' was exhibited in ‘Land of Mirrors: ongoing experiments in Newfoundland‘ at Eastern Edge Art Gallery, curated by Mary MacDonald alongside artists Will Gill, Jerry Ropson, Michael Flaherty and Jason Wells.

Author Lisa Moore wrote of this work: "Philippa Jones's installation ... captures the isolation of living in a town on an island in the North Atlantic, especially under the smothering, claustrophobic blanket of winter, when air travel is often thwarted and even a trip to the bar becomes a mythic voyage".

Art

Selected exhibitions 
2012 'New Romantics,' The Rooms Provincial Art Gallery
 2012 'Co-exist simultaneously' Solo show, Leyton Gallery of Fine Arts
 2013  'Boxed in' The Rooms Provincial Art Gallery & Craft Council Gallery, curated by Denis Longchamps
 2013 'MIRIAD’, The Rooms Provincial Art Gallery curated by Bruce Johnson
 2013  'Landscape Illuminated' The Leyton Gallery of Fine Art
 2014–15 ‘Shine a Light: Canadian Biennial 2014’ ,The National Gallery of Canada
 2015  Stories We Tell Ourselves'  Craft Council Gallery
 2015  'Elapsed’ Two Rivers Gallery, Prince George, curated by George Harris
 2015  'Fragments for your Imagination to Hold', Christina Parker Gallery
 2015  'Nature Present' Rotary Arts Centre, curated by Mary MacDonald
 2015–16  'Writing Topography, The Marion McCain Exhibition of Contemporary Atlantic Art' curated by Corinna Ghaznavi at Beaverbrook Art Gallery
 2016 ‘Land of Mirrors: ongoing experiments in Newfoundland‘, Eastern Edge Art Gallery, Curated by Mary MacDonald
 2016 'The Expanded Place' Christina Parker Gallery

Residency 
2012 Artist in Residence, Elbow Room, The Rooms Provincial Art Gallery.

Collections 
 The National Gallery of Canada
 City of St John's, NL
 The Provincial Art Bank, NL
 The Rooms Permanent Collection
 Private Collections

Further reading

Books 
 Shine a Light / Surgir de l'ombre: Canadian Biennial 2014 / La biennale canadienne 2014, by Josee Drouin-brisebois (Author), Greg Hill (Author), Andrea Kunard (Author), Jonathan Shaughnessy (Author), Rhiannon Vogl (Author). Publisher: Natl Gallery of Canada; Bilingual edition (2 September 2014) 
 Printmaking on the edge, 40 years at St. Michael's, (2014) Kevin Major (Author) publisher: St. Michael's Printshop
 Writing Topography / Cree la topographie: The Marion McCain Exhibition of Contemporary Atlantic Art / L'Exposition Marion McCaind'art contemporain de la region Atlantique by Corinna, Ph.D. Ghaznavi, Publisher: Beaverbrook Art Gallery (1871) ASIN: B01K93H50A

Articles 
 2012 Canadian Art Magazine, review of the 'New Romantics’ Katie Bethune-Leamen
 2013 Pages No. 1, a Rooms publication, 'MIRIAD: An exercise in rational amusement', Mireille Eagan
 2013 C magazine No. 118 Gloria Hickey review of 'MIRIAD’
 2013 Akimbo Hit List Philippa Jones
 2013 Riddle Fence No. 14 feature, interview with Sara Tilley on 'MIRIAD’
 2014 The Overcast'Structure and Randomness: Current works by Philippa Jones', Martin Poole
 2014 Apartment 613 'MIRIAD Island by Philippa Jones on exhibit at NGC', by Charlene Lau Ahier
 2015 The Telegram 'Letting the imagination go', Tara Bradbury
 2015 The Overcast, 'Philippa Jones’ Latest Exhibit, Fragments for your imagination to hold', Craig Francis Power
 2015 National Gallery of Canada Magazine ‘Mapping the Contours of Atlantic Canada through Art‘ By Shannon Moore
 2016 Canadian Art Magazine ‘What Is the New Newfoundland Dream?, Lisa Moore
 2016 The Telegram, 'Philippa Jones has people wondering what's real and what's not with her newest art show', Tara Bradbury

Published writing 
 2016 The Crafted Home
 2016-10-13, Get to know Jessica Waterman: artist, costume designer, furniture maker', By Philippa Jones, Home and Cabin Magazine

References

External links
 Philippa Jones interviewed as part of "Shine a Light" at the National Gallery of Canada
 Artist Website
 "Documentary" as part of MIRIAD
 http://miriad.ca/

Canadian painters
British painters
Living people
1982 births
20th-century Canadian artists
Artists from Newfoundland and Labrador
Canadian multimedia artists
20th-century Canadian women artists
Canadian installation artists